MCTC can refer to:
Maysville Community and Technical College in Maysville, Kentucky
Melbourne Community Television Consortium
Middle College for Technology Careers
Minneapolis Community and Technical College
Message Community Telephone Company
Mysore Road Satellite Bus Station, Bangalore
Melbourne Community Television Consortium in Melbourne, Australia
Military Corrective Training Centre in Colchester, Essex, England